David Charles Hopkins (1952) is a researcher of ancient history and near eastern archaeology, and a professor in the Religion department of Archaeology, and Biblical Interpretation at Wesley Theological Seminary, Washington D. C. Hopkins is editor of Near Eastern Archaeology.

Life 
David Hopkins was born on November 25, 1952. He was raised in northern New Jersey, where he become a member of Community Church of Mountain Lakes (United Church of Christ).

Education 
Hopkins earned a B.S. at Trinity College (Hartford). He obtained his M.A. at Vanderbilt University. Hopkins holds his Ph.D. obtained at Vanderbilt University with his thesis Agricultural subsistence in the early Iron Age highlands of Canaan.

Teaching 
Hopkins was a teacher at Lancaster Theological Seminary for six years. He began working as an associate professor, and later as a professor at Wesley Theological Seminary for eighteen years.

Works

Thesis

Books

Articles

References 

1952 births
Living people
Vanderbilt University alumni
Wesley Theological Seminary